The Delta Upsilon Fraternity House is a historic fraternity house located at the University of Illinois at Urbana–Champaign in Champaign, Illinois. The house was built in 1926-27 for the university's chapter of the Delta Upsilon fraternity, which was established in 1905. In its early days, the fraternity was known for its academic success; early members included actor George Chandler and chemist Arnold Beckman. Architect Leonard Steube designed the Tudor Revival building. The house combines elements of the more formal types of Tudor Revival architecture, such as its brick gabled entrance and chimney with stone details, with less formal elements such as extensive half-timbering.

The house was added to the National Register of Historic Places on May 21, 1990.

References

Residential buildings on the National Register of Historic Places in Illinois
Tudor Revival architecture in the United States
Houses completed in 1926
National Register of Historic Places in Champaign County, Illinois
Buildings and structures in Champaign, Illinois
Buildings and structures of the University of Illinois Urbana-Champaign
Fraternity and sorority houses
Delta Upsilon